Gregory Newsome II (born May 18, 2000) is an American football cornerback for the Cleveland Browns of the National Football League (NFL). He played college football at Northwestern and was drafted by the Browns in the first round of the 2021 NFL Draft.

Early years
Newsome attended Glenbard North High School in Carol Stream, Illinois before transferring to IMG Academy in Bradenton, Florida for his senior year. He committed to Northwestern University to play college football.

College career
Newsome recorded 71 tackles and one interception over three years at Northwestern. He started 18 games and led the Wildcats to two Big Ten title games. As a junior in 2020, he was named an All-American by The Athletic. After that season, he entered the 2021 NFL Draft.

Professional career

On April 29, 2021, Newsome was selected by the Cleveland Browns in the first round with the 26th overall pick in the 2021 NFL Draft. Newsome's pick marked the first time Northwestern has had two first-round picks in the NFL draft after Rashawn Slater was taken 13th overall. He was the fourth cornerback taken in the draft. On July 24, 2021, Newsome signed his four-year rookie contract with Cleveland, worth $12.75 million. He started all 12 games he appeared in as a rookie. He had 37 total tackles and nine passes defensed. In the 2022 season, he started all 15 games he appeared in. He had .5 sacks, 42 total tackles, and six passes defensed.

NFL career statistics

Regular season

References

External links
Cleveland Browns bio
Northwestern Wildcats bio

2000 births
Living people
Players of American football from Chicago
American football cornerbacks
Northwestern Wildcats football players
Cleveland Browns players